"Push" is a song by American rock band Matchbox Twenty. It was released in 1997 as the second single from their debut album, Yourself or Someone Like You (1996). After landing "Long Day" on several rock radio stations paving the way, "Push" topped the US Modern Rock Tracks chart and became one of the band's most successful singles. At the time of its release, "Push" was controversial for its lyrics, with many critics accusing the band of glorifying domestic violence.

Music video
The video for "Push" was directed by Nigel Dick, and shot March 27–28, 1997, in Los Angeles. The video starts and ends with Rob Thomas playing with a puppet. Throughout the song, the band is seen playing in an alley. A couple of scenes feature Thomas chained to a wall. Another scene is of Thomas holding onto a barbed wire fence while the band stands in the background.  He gets stuck by the fence but keeps putting his hands back on it. Thomas is also seen in a room containing a clock and a bed, though no windows are shown.

Controversy 
When the song came out initially, some feminist groups were outraged and claimed the song was about abusing women, even though frontman Rob Thomas stated that the man in the song (either himself or fictional) was the one being abused, either emotionally or physically, by a woman. Thomas expressed surprise when he heard that the song was being misinterpreted as misogynistic. He added, "[A former girlfriend of mine] was an ingredient in the song—but other people have scarred me. I mean, I'm not gonna pay my third-grade librarian, who gave me shit about not returning  Green Eggs and Ham." In an interview with The Morning Call, Thomas described the song as falling in and out love, with bass guitarist Brian Yale adding "We were kind of surprised when we heard all that stuff. [Our response] was, 'Wow, really? No, it's not about that.' I mean, just meet us. We're not the manliest of men all the time. I'm a short guy. I don't think I could kick anyone's (butt)."

Track listings and formats
 12-inch vinyl, cassette, and CD single
 "Push"  – 3:59
 "Tired"  – 3:44

 Maxi-single
 "Push"  – 3:59
 "Busted" (acoustic) – 4:24
 "Tired"  – 3:44

Credits and personnel
Credits and personnel are adapted from the Yourself or Someone Like You album liner notes.
 Rob Thomas – vocals, writer
 Kyle Cook – lead guitar, background vocals
 Adam Gaynor – rhythm guitar, background vocals
 Brian Yale – bass
 Paul Doucette – drums
 Matt Serletic – writer, producer, mixing, composition and arrangement
 Jeff Tomei – engineering
 Greg Archilla – mixing
 John Nielson – recording assistant
 Malcolm Springer – mixing assistant
 Stephen Marcussen – mastering
 Don C. Tyler – digital editing

Charts

Weekly charts

Year-end charts

Certifications and sales

Release history

In popular culture
An extract of the song was used in "Weird Al" Yankovic's song, "Polka Power!", off the album  Running with Scissors.

See also
 List of number-one alternative singles of 1997 (U.S.)

References

Matchbox Twenty songs
1996 songs
1997 singles
Atlantic Records singles
Lava Records singles
Song recordings produced by Matt Serletic
Songs about domestic violence
Songs written by Matt Serletic
Songs written by Rob Thomas (musician)
Music videos directed by Nigel Dick